The Toronto Labour Day Parade is an annual event held in the city of Toronto. The first parade was held in December 1872 and was organized by what was then the Toronto Trades and Labour Assembly and staged in support of the Toronto Typographical Union's strike for a 58-hour work-week.  Twenty-seven unions joined the parade to demonstrate in support of the Typographical Union who had been on strike since 25 March. The Toronto Trades and Labour Council (successor to the TTA) subsequently held similar celebrations every spring. On 23 July 1894, Canadian Prime Minister John Thompson's government made Labour Day an official holiday, moving it to the first Monday of September. Consequently, subsequent parades were held on the new date.

The modern parade is organized by the Toronto and York District Labour Council following a route down University Avenue, then west along Queen Street West then  proceeding down Dufferin Street entering the Canadian National Exhibition via the Dufferin Gate.

References
 

Trade unions in Ontario
Parades in Toronto
Recurring events established in 1872
Annual events in Toronto
Labour relations in Ontario